Enrico Caruso (25 February 1873 – 2 August 1921) was an Italian operatic first lyric tenor then dramatic tenor. He sang to great acclaim at the major opera houses of Europe and the Americas, appearing in a wide variety of roles (74) from the Italian and French repertoires that ranged from the lyric to the dramatic. One of the first major singing talents to be commercially recorded, Caruso made 247 commercially released recordings from 1902 to 1920, which made him an international popular entertainment star.

Biography

Early life

Enrico Caruso came from a poor but not destitute background. Born in Naples in the via Santi Giovanni e Paolo n° 7 on 25 February 1873, he was baptised the next day in the adjacent Church of San Giovanni e Paolo. His parents originally came from Piedimonte d'Alife (now called Piedimonte Matese), in the Province of Caserta in Campania, Southern Italy.

Caruso was the third of seven children and one of only three to survive infancy. There is a story of Caruso's parents having had 21 children, 18 of whom died in infancy. However, on the basis of genealogical research (amongst others conducted by Caruso family friend Guido D'Onofrio), biographers Pierre Key, Francis Robinson, and Enrico Caruso Jr. and Andrew Farkas, have proven this to be an urban legend. Caruso himself and his brother Giovanni may have been the source of the exaggerated number. Caruso's widow Dorothy also included the story in a memoir that she wrote about her husband. She quotes the tenor, speaking of his mother, Anna Caruso (née Baldini): "She had twenty-one children. Twenty boys and one girl – too many. I am number nineteen boy."

Caruso's father, Marcellino, was a mechanic and foundry worker. Initially, Marcellino thought his son should adopt the same trade, and at the age of 11, the boy was apprenticed to a mechanical engineer who constructed public water fountains. (Whenever visiting Naples in future years, Caruso liked to point out a fountain that he had helped to install.) Caruso later worked alongside his father at the Meuricoffre factory in Naples. At his mother's insistence, he also attended school for a time, receiving a basic education under the tutelage of a local priest. He learned to write in a handsome script and studied technical draftsmanship. During this period he sang in his church choir, and his voice showed enough promise for him to contemplate a possible career in music.

Caruso was encouraged in his early musical ambitions by his mother, who died in 1888. To raise cash for his family, he found work as a street singer in Naples and performed at cafes and soirées. Aged 18, he used the fees he had earned by singing at an Italian resort to buy his first pair of new shoes. His progress as a paid entertainer was interrupted, however, by 45 days of compulsory military service. He completed this in 1894, resuming his voice lessons upon discharge from the army.

Early career
On 15 March 1895 at the age of 22, Caruso made his professional stage debut at the Teatro Nuovo in Naples in the now-forgotten opera, L'Amico Francesco, by the amateur composer Mario Morelli. A string of further engagements in provincial opera houses followed, and he received instruction from the conductor and voice teacher Vincenzo Lombardi that improved his high notes and polished his style. Three other prominent Neapolitan singers taught by Lombardi were the baritones Antonio Scotti and Pasquale Amato, both of whom would go on to partner Caruso at the Metropolitan Opera and the tenor Fernando De Lucia, who would also appear at the Met and later sing at Caruso's funeral.

Money continued to be in short supply for the young Caruso. One of his first publicity photographs, taken on a visit to Sicily in 1896, depicts him wearing a bedspread draped like a toga since his sole dress shirt was away being laundered.

During the final few years of the 19th century, Caruso performed at a succession of theatres throughout Italy until 1900, when he was rewarded with a contract to sing at La Scala. His La Scala debut occurred on 26 December of that year in the part of Rodolfo in Giacomo Puccini's La bohème with Arturo Toscanini conducting. Audiences in Monte Carlo, Warsaw and Buenos Aires also heard Caruso sing during this pivotal phase of his career and, in 1899–1900, he appeared before the Tsar and the Russian aristocracy at the Mariinsky Theatre in Saint Petersburg and the Bolshoi Theatre in Moscow as part of a touring company of first-class Italian singers.

The first major operatic role that Caruso created was Federico in Francesco Cilea's L'arlesiana (1897); then he was Loris in Umberto Giordano's Fedora (1898) at the Teatro Lirico, Milan. At that same theatre he created the role of Maurizio in Francesco Cilea's Adriana Lecouvreur (1902). Puccini considered casting the young Caruso in the role of Cavaradossi in Tosca at its premiere in January 1900, but ultimately chose the older, more established Emilio De Marchi instead. Caruso appeared in the role later that year and Puccini stated that Caruso sang the part better.

Caruso took part in a grand concert at La Scala in February 1901 that Toscanini organised to mark the recent death of Giuseppe Verdi. Among those appearing with him at the concert were two other leading Italian tenors of the day, Francesco Tamagno (the creator of the protagonist's role in Verdi's Otello) and Giuseppe Borgatti (the creator of the protagonist's role in Giordano's Andrea Chénier). In December 1901, Caruso made his debut at the San Carlo Opera House in Naples in L'Elisir d'Amore to a lukewarm reception; two weeks later he appeared as Des Grieux in Massenet's Manon which was even more coolly received. The indifference of the audiences and harsh critical reviews in his native city upset him deeply and he vowed never to sing there again. He later said: "I will never again come to Naples to sing; it will only be to eat a plate of spaghetti". Caruso embarked on his last series of La Scala performances in March 1902, creating the principal tenor part of Federico Loewe in Germania by Alberto Franchetti.

A month later, on 11 April, he was engaged by the Gramophone Company to make his first group of acoustic recordings in a Milan hotel room for a fee of 100 pounds sterling. These ten discs swiftly became best-sellers. Among other things, they helped spread 29-year-old Caruso's fame throughout the English-speaking world. The management of London's Royal Opera House, Covent Garden, signed him for a season of appearances in eight different operas ranging from Verdi's Aida to Mozart's Don Giovanni. His successful debut at Covent Garden occurred on 14 May 1902, as the Duke of Mantua in Verdi's Rigoletto. Covent Garden's highest-paid diva, the Australian soprano Nellie Melba, partnered him as Gilda. They would sing together often during the early 1900s. In her memoirs, Melba praised Caruso's voice but considered him to be a less sophisticated musician and interpretive artist than Jean de Reszke—the Met's biggest tenor drawcard prior to Caruso.

Metropolitan Opera
In 1903, Caruso made his debut with the Metropolitan Opera in New York City. The gap between his London and New York engagements had been filled by a series of performances in Italy, Portugal and South America. Caruso's contract had been negotiated by his agent, the banker and impresario Pasquale Simonelli. Caruso's debut was in a new production of Rigoletto on 23 November 1903. This time, Marcella Sembrich sang opposite him as Gilda. A few months later, he began his lifelong association with the Victor Talking Machine Company. He made his first American records on 1 February 1904, having signed a lucrative financial deal with Victor. Thereafter, his recording career ran in tandem with his Met career, both bolstering each other, until his death in 1921.

Caruso purchased the Villa Bellosguardo, a palatial country house near Florence, in 1904. The villa became his retreat away from the pressures of the operatic stage and the grind of travel. Caruso's preferred address in New York City was a suite at Manhattan's Knickerbocker Hotel. Caruso commissioned the New York jewellers Tiffany & Co. to strike a 24-carat-gold medal adorned with the tenor's profile. He presented the medal in gratitude to Simonelli as a souvenir of his many well-remunerated performances at the Met.

In addition to his regular New York engagements, Caruso gave recitals and operatic performances in a large number of cities across the United States and sang in Canada. He also continued to sing widely in Europe, appearing again at Covent Garden in 1904–07 and 1913–14, and undertaking a UK tour in 1909. Audiences in France, Belgium, Monaco, Austria, Hungary and Germany also heard him before the outbreak of World War I. In 1909, Melba asked him to participate in her forthcoming tour of Australia, but he declined because of the significant amount of travel time that such a trip would entail.

Members of the Met's roster of artists, including Caruso, had visited San Francisco in April 1906 for a series of performances. Following an appearance as Don José in Carmen at the city's Grand Opera House, a strong jolt awakened Caruso at 5:13 on the morning of the 18th in his suite at the Palace Hotel. He found himself in the middle of the San Francisco earthquake, which led to a series of fires that destroyed most of the city. The Met lost all the sets, costumes and musical instruments that it had brought on tour but none of the artists were harmed. Holding an autographed photo of President Theodore Roosevelt, Caruso ran from the hotel but was composed enough to walk to the St. Francis Hotel for breakfast. Charlie Olson, the broiler cook, made the tenor bacon and eggs. Apparently, the quake had no effect on Caruso's appetite, as he cleaned his plate and tipped Olson $2.50. Caruso made an ultimately successful effort to flee the city, first by boat and then by train. He vowed never to return to San Francisco and kept his word.

In November 1906, Caruso was charged with an indecent act allegedly committed in the monkey house of New York's Central Park Zoo. The police accused him of pinching the buttocks of a married woman. Caruso claimed a monkey did the bottom-pinching. He was found guilty and fined 10 dollars, although suspicions linger that he may have been entrapped by the victim and the arresting officer. The leaders of New York's opera-going high society were outraged initially by the incident, which received widespread newspaper coverage, but they soon forgot about it and continued to attend Caruso's Met performances. Caruso's fan base at the Met was not restricted, however, to the wealthy. Members of America's middle classes also paid to hear him sing—or buy copies of his recordings—and he enjoyed a substantial following among New York's 500,000 Italian immigrants.

Caruso created the role of Dick Johnson in the world premiere of Puccini's La fanciulla del West on 10 December 1910. The composer conceived the music for Johnson with Caruso's voice specifically in mind. With Caruso appeared two more of the Met's star singers, the Czech soprano Emmy Destinn and baritone Pasquale Amato. Toscanini, then the Met's principal conductor, presided in the orchestra pit.

Extortion by Black Hand 
Caruso's success in the Metropolitan Opera drew the attention of Black Hand extortionists. They threatened to injure his throat with lye or harm him and his family if he did not pay them money. He initially paid their extortion fee of $2,000 expecting the matter to be settled, but his willingness to pay made them more brazen. They subsequently demanded an even larger sum of $15,000." He was aided by New York City police detective Joseph Petrosino who, impersonating Caruso, captured the extortionists. Two Italian men, Antonio Misiano and Antonio Cincotto, would be later specifically accused of the crime.

Later career and personal life

Caruso's timbre darkened as he aged and, from 1916 onwards, he began adding heroic parts such as Samson, John of Leyden, and Eléazar to his repertoire. Caruso toured the South American nations of Argentina, Uruguay, and Brazil in 1917, and two years later performed in Mexico City. In 1920, he was paid the enormous sum of 10,000 U.S. dollars a night (~$126,000 in 2018) to sing in Havana, Cuba.

The United States had entered World War I in 1917, sending troops to Europe. Caruso did extensive charity work during the conflict, raising money for war-related patriotic causes by giving concerts and participating enthusiastically in Liberty Bond drives. The tenor had shown himself to be a shrewd businessman since arriving in America. He put a sizable proportion of his earnings from record royalties and singing fees into a range of investments. Biographer Michael Scott writes that by the end of the war in 1918, Caruso's annual income tax bill amounted to $154,000.

Prior to World War I, Caruso had been romantically linked to an Italian soprano, Ada Giachetti, who was a few years older than he was. Though already married, Giachetti bore Caruso four sons during their liaison, which lasted from 1897 to 1908. Two survived infancy: Rodolfo Caruso (1898–1951) and singer/actor Enrico Caruso Jr. (1904–1987). Ada had left her husband, manufacturer Gino Botti, and an existing son to cohabit with the tenor. Information provided in Scott's biography of Caruso suggests that she was his vocal coach as well as his lover. Statements by Enrico Caruso Jr. in his book tend to substantiate this. Her relationship with Caruso broke down after 11 years and they separated. Giachetti's subsequent attempts to sue him for damages were dismissed by the courts.

Towards the end of the war, Caruso met and courted a 25-year-old socialite, Dorothy Park Benjamin (1893–1955). She was the daughter of a wealthy New York patent lawyer. In spite of the disapproval of Dorothy's father, the couple wed on 20 August 1918. They had a daughter, Gloria Caruso (1919–1999). Dorothy wrote two biographies of Caruso, published in 1928 and 1945. The books include many of Caruso's letters to his wife.

A fastidious dresser, Caruso took at least two baths a day and enjoyed good food and convivial company. He forged a particularly close bond with his Met and Covent Garden colleague Antonio Scotti – an amiable and stylish baritone from Naples. Caruso was superstitious and habitually carried several good-luck charms with him when he sang. He played cards for relaxation and sketched friends, other singers and musicians. His wife, Dorothy, said that by the time she knew him, her husband's favourite hobby was compiling scrapbooks. He also amassed valuable collections of rare postage stamps, coins, watches and antique snuffboxes. Caruso was a heavy smoker of strong Egyptian cigarettes. This deleterious habit, combined with a lack of exercise and the punishing schedule of performances that Caruso willingly undertook season after season at the Met, may have contributed to the persistent ill-health which afflicted the last year of his life.

Illness and death

On 16 September 1920, Caruso concluded three days of recording sessions at Victor's Trinity Church studio in Camden, New Jersey. He recorded several discs, including the Domine Deus and Crucifixus from the Petite messe solennelle by Rossini. These recordings were to be his last.

Dorothy Caruso noted that her husband's health began to decline in late 1920 after he returned from a lengthy North American concert tour. In his biography, Enrico Caruso Jr. points to an on-stage injury suffered by Caruso as the possible trigger of his fatal illness. A falling pillar in Samson and Delilah on 3 December had hit him on the back, over the left kidney (and not on the chest as popularly reported). A few days before a performance of Pagliacci at the Met (Pierre Key says it was 4 December, the day after the Samson and Delilah injury) he suffered a chill and developed a cough and a "dull pain in his side". It appeared to be a severe episode of bronchitis. Caruso's physician, Philip Horowitz, who usually treated him for migraine headaches with a kind of primitive TENS unit, diagnosed "intercostal neuralgia" and pronounced him fit to appear on stage, although the pain continued to hinder his voice production and movements.

During a performance of L'elisir d'amore by Donizetti at the Brooklyn Academy of Music on 11 December 1920, he suffered a throat haemorrhage and the performance was cancelled at the end of Act 1. Following this incident, a clearly unwell Caruso gave only three more performances at the Met, the final one being as Eléazar in Halévy's La Juive, on 24 December 1920. By Christmas Day, the pain in his side was so excruciating that he was screaming. Dorothy summoned the hotel physician, who gave Caruso some morphine and codeine and called in another doctor, Evan M. Evans. Evans brought in three other doctors and Caruso finally received a correct diagnosis: purulent pleurisy and empyema.

Caruso's health deteriorated further during the new year, lapsing into a coma and nearly dying of heart failure at one point. He experienced episodes of intense pain because of the infection and underwent seven surgical procedures to drain fluid from his chest and lungs. He slowly began to improve and he returned to Naples in May 1921 to recuperate from the most serious of the operations, during which part of a rib had been removed. According to Dorothy Caruso, he seemed to be recovering but allowed himself to be examined by an unhygienic local doctor, and his condition worsened dramatically after that. The Bastianelli brothers, eminent medical practitioners with a clinic in Rome, recommended that his left kidney be removed. He was on his way to Rome to see them but, while staying overnight in the Vesuvio Hotel in Naples, his condition deteriorated and was given morphine to help him sleep.

Caruso died at the hotel shortly after 9:00 a.m. local time, on 2 August 1921. He was 48. The Bastianellis attributed the cause of death to peritonitis arising from a burst subphrenic abscess. The King of Italy, Victor Emmanuel III, opened the Royal Basilica of the Church of San Francesco di Paola for Caruso's funeral, which was attended by thousands of people. His embalmed body was preserved in a glass sarcophagus at Del Pianto Cemetery in Naples for mourners to view. In 1929, Dorothy Caruso had his remains sealed permanently in an ornate stone tomb.

Historical and musical significance
Caruso's career, which lasted from 1895 to 1920, included 863 appearances with the New York Metropolitan Opera (both at the Met and on tour) before his death in 1921 at the age of 48. Thanks largely to his tremendously popular phonograph records, Caruso was one of the most famous entertainment personalities of his day, and his fame has continued to endure to the present. He was one of the first examples of a global media celebrity. Beyond records, Caruso's name became familiar to millions throughout the world via newspapers, books, magazines, and the new media technology of the 20th century: cinema, the telephone, and telegraph.

Caruso toured widely both with the Metropolitan Opera touring company and on his own, giving hundreds of performances throughout Europe, and North and South America. He was a client of the noted promoter Edward Bernays, during the latter's tenure as a press agent in the United States. Beverly Sills noted in an interview: "I was able to do it with television and radio and media and all kinds of assists. The popularity that Caruso enjoyed without any of this technological assistance is astonishing."

Caruso biographers Pierre Key, Bruno Zirato and Stanley Jackson attribute Caruso's fame not only to his voice and musicianship but also to a keen business sense and an enthusiastic embrace of commercial sound recording, then in its infancy. Many opera singers of Caruso's time rejected the phonograph (or gramophone) owing to the low fidelity of early discs. Others, including Adelina Patti, Francesco Tamagno and Nellie Melba, exploited the new technology once they became aware of the financial returns that Caruso was reaping from his initial recording sessions.

Caruso made more than 260 extant recordings in America for the Victor Talking Machine Company (later RCA Victor) from 1904 to 1920, and he and his heirs earned millions of dollars in royalties from the retail sales of these records. He was also heard live from the stage of the Metropolitan Opera House in 1910, when he participated in the first public radio broadcast to be transmitted in the United States.

Caruso also appeared in two motion pictures. In 1918, he played a dual role in the American My Cousin (silent film, entirely restored in July 2021) for Paramount Pictures. This film included a sequence depicting him on stage performing the aria Vesti la giubba from Leoncavallo's opera Pagliacci. The following year Caruso played a character called Cosimo in another film, The Splendid Romance. Producer Jesse Lasky paid Caruso $100,000 each to appear in these two efforts but My Cousin flopped at the box office, and The Splendid Romance was apparently never released. Brief candid glimpses of Caruso offstage have been preserved in contemporary newsreel footage.

While Caruso sang at such venues as La Scala in Milan, the Royal Opera House, in London, the Mariinsky Theatre in Saint Petersburg, and the Teatro Colón in Buenos Aires, he appeared most often at the Metropolitan Opera in New York City, where he was the leading tenor for 18 consecutive seasons. It was at the Met, in 1910, that he created the role of Dick Johnson in Giacomo Puccini's La fanciulla del West.

Caruso's voice extended up to high D-flat in its prime and grew in power and weight as he grew older. At times, his voice took on a dark, almost baritonal coloration. He sang a broad spectrum of roles, ranging from lyric, to spinto, to dramatic parts, in the Italian and French repertoires. In the German repertoire, Caruso sang only two roles, Assad (in Karl Goldmark's The Queen of Sheba) and Richard Wagner's Lohengrin, both of which he performed in Italian in Buenos Aires in 1899 and 1901, respectively.

Honors

During his lifetime, Caruso received many orders, decorations, testimonials and other kinds of honours from monarchs, governments and miscellaneous cultural bodies of the various nations in which he sang. He was also the recipient of Italian knighthoods. In 1917, he was elected an honorary member of the Phi Mu Alpha Sinfonia, the national fraternity for men involved in music, by the fraternity's Alpha chapter of the New England Conservatory of Music in Boston. One unusual award bestowed on him was that of "Honorary Captain of the New York Police Force". In 1960, for his contribution to the recording industry, Caruso received a star located at 6625 Hollywood Boulevard on the Hollywood Walk of Fame. Caruso was posthumously awarded a Grammy Lifetime Achievement Award in 1987. On 27 February of that same year, the United States Postal Service issued a 22-cent postage stamp in his honour. He was voted into Gramophones Hall of Fame in 2012.

Repertoire

Caruso's operatic repertoire consisted primarily of Italian works along with a few roles in French. He also performed two German operas, Wagner's Lohengrin and Goldmark's Die Königin von Saba, singing in Italian, early in his career. Below are the first performances by Caruso, in chronological order, of each of the operas that he undertook on the stage. World premieres are indicated with **.

 L'amico Francesco (Morelli) – Teatro Nuovo, Napoli, 15 March 1895 (debut)**
 Faust – Caserta, 28 March 1895
 Cavalleria rusticana – Caserta, April 1895
 Camoens (Musoni) – Caserta, May 1895
 Rigoletto – Napoli, 21 July 1895
 La traviata – Napoli, 25 August 1895
 Lucia di Lammermoor – Cairo, 30 October 1895
 La Gioconda – Cairo, 9 November 1895
 Manon Lescaut – Cairo, 15 November 1895
 I Capuleti e i Montecchi – Napoli, 7 December 1895
 Malia (Francesco Paolo Frontini) – Trapani, 21 March 1896
 La sonnambula – Trapani, 25 March 1896
 Mariedda – Napoli, 23 June 1896
 I puritani – Salerno, 10 September 1896
 La Favorita – Salerno, 22 November 1896
 A San Francisco (Sebastiani) – Salerno, 23 November 1896
 Carmen – Salerno, 6 December 1896

 Un Dramma in vendemmia (Fornari) – Napoli, 1 February 1897
 Celeste (Marengo) – Napoli, 6 March 1897**
 Il Profeta Velato (Napolitano) – Salerno, 8 April 1897
 La bohème – Livorno, 14 August 1897
 La Navarrese – Milano, 3 November 1897
 Il Voto (Giordano) – Milano, 10 November 1897**
 L'arlesiana – Milano, 27 November 1897**
 Pagliacci – Milano, 31 December 1897
 La bohème (Leoncavallo) – Genova, 20 January 1898
 The Pearl Fishers – Genova, 3 February 1898
 Hedda (Leborne) – Milano, 2 April 1898**
 Mefistofele – Fiume, 4 March 1898
 Sapho (Massenet) – Trento, 3 June (?) 1898
 Fedora – Milano, 17 November 1898**
 Iris – Buenos Aires, 22 June 1899
 La regina di Saba (Goldmark) – Buenos Aires, 4 July 1899
 Yupanki (Berutti)– Buenos Aires, 25 July 1899**
 Aida – St. Petersburg, 3 January 1900
 Un ballo in maschera – St. Petersburg, 11 January 1900
 Maria di Rohan – St. Petersburg, 2 March 1900

 Manon – Buenos Aires, 28 July 1900
 Tosca – Treviso, 23 October 1900
 Le maschere (Mascagni) – Milano, 17 January 1901**
 L'elisir d'amore – Milano, 17 February 1901
 Lohengrin – Buenos Aires, 7 July 1901
 Germania – Milano, 11 March 1902**
 Don Giovanni – London, 19 July 1902
 Adriana Lecouvreur – Milano, 6 November 1902**
 Lucrezia Borgia – Lisbon, 10 March 1903
 Les Huguenots – New York, 3 February 1905
 Martha – New York, 9 February 1906
 Madama Butterfly – London, 26 May 1906
 L'Africana – New York, 11 January 1907
 Andrea Chénier – London, 20 July 1907
 Il trovatore – New York, 26 February 1908
 Armide – New York, 14 November 1910
 La fanciulla del West – New York, 10 December 1910**
 Julien – New York, 26 December 1914
 Samson et Dalila – New York, 24 November 1916
 Lodoletta – Buenos Aires, 29 July 1917
 Le prophète – New York, 7 February 1918
 L'amore dei tre re – New York, 14 March 1918
 La forza del destino – New York, 15 November 1918
 La Juive – New York, 22 November 1919

Caruso also had a repertory of more than 500 songs. They ranged from classical compositions to traditional Italian melodies and popular tunes of the day, including a few English-language titles such as George M. Cohan's "Over There", Henry Geehl's "For You Alone" and Arthur Sullivan's "The Lost Chord".

Recordings

Caruso possessed a phonogenic voice which was "manly and powerful, yet sweet and lyrical", to quote the singer/author John Potter (see bibliography, below). He became one of the first major classical vocalists to make numerous recordings. Caruso and the disc phonograph, known in the United Kingdom as the gramophone did much to promote each other in the first two decades of the 20th century. Many of Caruso's recordings have remained continuously available since their original issue over a century ago, and all of his surviving recordings (including several unissued takes) have been remastered and reissued several times over the years. Although recordings of complete operas have been available since the early 1900s, (Carmen in 1908 for example), Caruso never participated in a complete opera recording.

Caruso's first recordings were arranged by recording pioneer Fred Gaisberg and cut on disc in three separate sessions in Milan during April, November and December 1902. They were made with piano accompaniments for HMV/EMI's forerunner, the Gramophone & Typewriter Limited. In April 1903, he made seven further recordings, also in Milan, for the Anglo-Italian Commerce Company (AICC). These were originally released on discs bearing the Zonophone label. Three more Milan recordings for AICC followed in October 1903, released by Pathé Records on cylinders as well as on discs. He made one final recording for the Gramophone & Typewriter Ltd in April 1904. On 1 February 1904, Caruso made his first recordings in America for the Victor Talking Machine Company and thereafter recorded exclusively for Victor. While most of Caruso's American recordings would be made in Victor's studios in New York and its headquarters 
in Camden, New Jersey, Caruso later recorded in Camden's Trinity Church, which Victor acquired as a recording studio in 1917 for its acoustical properties and which could accommodate a large band of musicians. Caruso's first recordings for Victor in 1904 were made in Room 826, a small vocal studio at Carnegie Hall in New York. "Questa o quella" and "La donna è mobile" from Verdi's Rigoletto were the first to be recorded. Caruso's final recording session took place at Victor's Trinity Church studio in Camden on 16 September 1920, with the tenor singing the "Domine Deus" and "Crucifixus" from Rossini's Petite messe solennelle.

Caruso's earliest Victor records of operatic arias from 1904 to 1905, like their thirty or so Milan-made predecessors, were all accompanied by piano. From February 1906, however, orchestral accompaniments became the norm, utilizing an ensemble of between eleven and twenty musicians. The regular conductors of these recording sessions with the orchestra were Walter B. Rogers and, from 1916, Josef Pasternack. Beginning in 1932, RCA Victor in the US and EMI (HMV) in the UK, reissued several of the Caruso discs with the original accompaniment over-dubbed by a larger electrically recorded orchestra. Earlier experiments using this re-dubbing technique, carried out by Victor in 1927, had been considered unsatisfactory. In 1950, RCA Victor reissued a number of Caruso recordings on 78-rpm discs pressed on red vinylite instead of the usual shellac. As long-playing discs (LPs) became popular, many of his recordings were electronically enhanced with reverb and similar effects to make them sound "fuller" for release on the extended format. RCA Victor issued its  first Caruso collections on LP in 1951;  most of these early compilations were also simultaneously released on RCA Victor's new 45-rpm format.

Caruso recorded with several sopranos including Nellie Melba, Geraldine Farrar, Amelita Galli-Curci, Frances Alda, Emmy Destinn, Alma Gluck, Frieda Hempel,  Luisa Tetrazzini, Johanna Gadski, Marcella Sembrich,  and Bessie Abott. Among the mezzo-sopranos and contraltos with whom Caruso made records, are Louise Homer, Minnie Egener, Flora Perini and Ernestine Schumann-Heink.

During the 1970s, Thomas G. Stockham of the University of Utah developed an early computer reprocessing technique called "Soundstream" to remaster Caruso's recordings for RCA. This digital recording process claimed to remove or reduce some of the undesirable resonances and reduced surface noise typical of the early acoustically recorded discs (critics of the process claimed that the recordings were merely "re-equalized" by increasing bass and reducing treble). From 1978 to 1985, RCA issued The Complete Caruso series on LP and cassette, utilizing these early digitised recordings (RCA never finished The Complete Caruso series on LP and the pre-1906 European and early Victor recordings were never remastered using the Soundstream process). RCA issued its first Caruso collection on compact disc in 1987. Finally in 1990, RCA Victor issued Caruso's complete recordings in a boxed set on twelve CDs (the recordings were repackaged and reissued by RCA again in 2004 and (minus the pre-Victor recordings) for a third time, in 2017). Other complete sets of Caruso's recordings in new remasterings were issued on CD on the Pearl label and in 2000–2004 by Naxos. The Pearl and Naxos sets were remastered by the noted American audio-restoration engineer Ward Marston. In 1993, Pearl also released a two-CD collection devoted to RCA and EMI's electrically over-dubbed versions of some of Caruso's original acoustic discs, originally issued in the 1930s. Since 2000, RCA Victor has issued three CDs of Caruso recordings with digitally recorded over-dubbed orchestral accompaniments. Since the expiration of their original copyrights, Caruso's records are now in the public domain in the United States and have been reissued by several different record labels with varying degrees of sound quality. They are also available over the internet as digital downloads. Caruso's best-selling downloads at iTunes have been the popular Italian folk songs "Santa Lucia" and "'O sole mio".

Caruso died before the introduction of high fidelity, electrical recording technology in 1925. All of his recordings were made using the acoustic process, which required the recording artist to sing into a metal horn or funnel which relayed sound directly to a wax master disc via a stylus. This antiquated process captured only a limited range of the overtones and nuances present in his singing voice. Caruso's 12-inch acoustic recordings were limited to a maximum duration of around four and one-half minutes. Consequently, most of the selections that he recorded were limited to those that could be edited to fit this time constraint. Longer selections were occasionally issued on two or more record sides.

Media

 
 
 
 
 
 
 
 
 
 
 
 
 [[File:Jules Massenet, Enrico Caruso, O Souverain, O Juge, O Pere.ogg|thumb|none|233px|"O souverain, O juge, O père!" from Massenet's Le Cid (1916)]]
 
 

See also
 Caruso sauce
 The Young Caruso 1951 Italian film
 The Great Caruso, 1951 US film
Caruso-Kronenboden-Collection, Berlin, Caruso sings againNotes

References
 
 
 
 
 

 Further reading 
 Anadón Mamés, Roberto, Lanzola, Andrea and Mouchon, Jean-Pierre (Eds.): Enrico Caruso. Nel centenario della morte (1921-2021), Milano, Rugginenti, 2023. ISBN 978-88-7665-692-7
 
 
 
 Caruso, Dorothy, and Goddard, Torrance Wings of Song: The Story of Caruso, (Milton, Balch & Company, New York, 1928).
 Douglas, Nigel, Legendary Voices (Andre Deutsch, London, 1992).
 Gargano, Pietro and Cesarini, Gianni, Caruso, Vita e arte di un grande cantante (Longanesi, 1990).
 Gargano, Pietro, Una vita una leggenda (Editoriale Giorgio Mondadori, 1997).
 Griffith, Hugh, CD liner notes for The Complete Recordings of Enrico Caruso, volumes 1 & 2, produced by Ward Marston (Naxos Historical, 8.110703, 8.110704, 2000 HNH International Ltd).
 Il Progresso italo americano, Il banchiere p. 1 at bluehawk.monmouth.edu; che portò Caruso, negli US, sezione B – supplemento illustrato della domenica, New York, 27 luglio 1986.
 , "Particularités physiques et phonétiques de la voix enregistrée de Caruso", foreword by Prof.André Appaix (in Le Sud Médical et Chirurgical, 99e année, n°2509, Marseille, France, 31 October 1964, pp. 11812–11829).
 Mouchon, Jean-Pierre, "Enrico Caruso. 1873–1921. Sa vie et sa voix. Étude psycho-physiologique, physique, phonétique et esthétique", foreword by Dr. Édouard-Jean Garde (Académie régionale de chant lyrique, Marseille, France, 1966, 106 p. ill.).
 Mouchon, Jean-Pierre, "Enrico Caruso. His Life and Voice" (Éditions Ophrys, Gap, France, 1974, 77 p. ill.).
 Mouchon, Jean-Pierre, "Enrico Caruso. L'homme et l'artiste, 4 vol.: Première partie. L'homme (Étude psycho-physiologique et historique), pp. 1–653 bis, ill.; deuxième partie. L'artiste (étude physique, phonétique, linguistique et esthétique), pp. 654–975 bis, bibliographie critique, index des représentations données par Enrico Caruso entre 1895 et 1920, index de ses concerts et récitals, pp. 976–1605 (Paris-Sorbonne 1978, published by Atelier national de reproduction des thèses, Université de Lille III, 9, rue Auguste Angellier, 59046 Lille, France in three volumes, and by Didier-Érudition, Paris, in microfiches).
 Mouchon, Jean-Pierre, "Chronologie de la carrière artistique du ténor Enrico Caruso" (Académie Régionale de Chant Lyrique, Marseilles, France, 1992, 423 p., ill.).
 Mouchon, Jean-Pierre, "Caruso in Concert" (in "Étude" n. 46, "Hommage à Marguerite-Marie Dubois", January–February–March–April 2010, pp. 12–37, Journal of Association internationale de chant lyrique "Titta Ruffo", Marseilles, France, edited by Jean-Pierre Mouchon).
 Mouchon, Jean-Pierre, "Enrico Caruso. L'homme et l'artiste", two volumes (Terra Beata, Société littéraire et historique), 45, bd. Notre-Dame, 13006, Marseille, France, 2011, 1359 pp., ill.
 Mouchon, Jean-Pierre, "Enrico Caruso. Deuxième partie. (La voix et l'art, les enregistrements). Étude physique, phonétique, linguistique et esthétique." Volume III (Association internationale de chant lyrique Titta Ruffo, 2012, 433 p. ill. ).
 Mouchon, Jean-Pierre, "Le Ténor Enrico Caruso. Volume I (La voix et l'art),Étude physique, phonétique, linguistique et esthétique". Édilivre, Saint-Denis, 2015, 131 pp., ill.)
 Mouchon, Jean-Pierre, "Le Ténor Enrico Caruso. Volume II (Les enregistrements), Étude physique, phonétique, linguistique et esthétique". Édilivre, Saint-Denis, 2015, 381 pp., ill.)
 Mouchon, Jean-Pierre, "Enrico Caruso, interprète de Turiddu et de Canio" (in Avant-Scène Opéra, "Cavalleria rusticana/Pagliacci. Mascagni/Leoncavallo", 147 pp., n° 295, 2016, pp. 15–18).
 Pleasants, Henry, The Great Singers (Macmillan Publishing, London, 1983).
 Potter, John, Tenor: History of a Voice (Yale University Press, New Haven & London, 2009).
 Steane, John, The Grand Tradition: 70 Years of Singing on Disc (Duckworth, London, 1974).
 Vaccaro, Riccardo, Caruso'', foreword by Dr. Ruffo Titta (Edizioni Scientifiche Italiane, Naples, Italy, 1995).

External links

 
 
 
 Complete Thesis of Jean-Pierre Mouchon "Enrico Caruso. The Man and the Artist" (Terra Beata, 45, bd. Notre-Dame, 13006. Marseille, France, 2011, 1359 p. ill. )
 Caruso, Enrico and Luisa Tetrazzini: Caruso and Tetrazzini on the Art of Singing (1909), complete text at Project Gutenberg
 "Caruso and the San Francisco Earthquake" San Francisco Museum
 Enrico Caruso recordings at the Discography of American Historical Recordings.
 
 The Enrico Caruso Museum of America
 The Enrico Caruso Page
 Enrico Caruso – Sound Clips and Narration at History of the Tenor
 Recordings of Caruso Part 1, Part 2 Audio files at Internet Archive
 Video of Caruso at 1908 opening of Teatro Colon in Buenos Aires
 
 Simonelli, Pasquale (2012), Enrico Caruso Unedited Notes, Charleston, SC.: S.E.A.O. Inc. 
 

 
1873 births
1921 deaths
1906 San Francisco earthquake survivors
19th-century Italian male singers
20th-century Italian male opera singers
Articles containing video clips
Burials in Italy
Deaths from peritonitis
Grammy Lifetime Achievement Award winners
Italian emigrants to the United States
Italian operatic tenors
Musicians from Naples
Victor Records artists
Italian tenors
Italian singers
Pathé Records artists